Tartu JK Tammeka U21 is the reserve team of JK Tammeka Tartu, an Estonian football club. They last played  in the Esiliiga, the second level of the Estonian football league pyramid. The team was dissolved for 2014 season because of financial trouble of Tammeka, but reformed later.

History

References

External links
 Official website
 Tartu JK Tammeka U21 at Estonian Football Association
Tartu JK Tammeka II (2007–2013) at Estonian Football Association

Tammeka Tartu II
Tammeka II Tartu
2006 establishments in Estonia
Association football clubs established in 2006